Teegarden may refer to:

Teegarden, Indiana
Teegarden, Ohio
Teegarden's Star
Teegarden & Van Winkle
Teegarden (surname)